The 2011 FIBA U20 European Championship Division B was the 7th edition of the Division B of the European basketball championship for men's national under-20 teams. It was played from 14 to 24 July 2011 in Sarajevo, Bosnia and Herzegovina.

Participating teams

  (16th place, 2010 FIBA Europe Under-20 Championship Division A)

  (15th place, 2010 FIBA Europe Under-20 Championship Division A)

First round
In the first round, the teams were drawn into four groups. The first two teams from each group advance to the quarterfinal round; the third and fourth teams advance to the 9th–16th place classification; the other teams will play in the 17th–22nd place classification groups.

Group A

Group B

Group C

Group D

Quarterfinal round
In this round, the teams play in two groups. The first two teams from each group advance to the semifinals; the other teams will play the 5th–8th place playoffs.

Group E

Group F

9th–16th place classification
In this round, the teams play in two groups. The first two teams from each group advance to the 9th–12th place playoffs; the other teams will play the 13th–16th place playoffs.

Group G

Group H

17th–22nd place classification
In this round, the teams play in two groups. The first teams from each group advance to the 17th place match; the second teams advance to the 19th place match; the last teams advance to the 21st place match.

Group I

Group J

21st place match

19th place match

17th place match

13th−16th place playoffs

13th–16th place semifinals

15th place match

13th place match

9th−12th place playoffs

9th–12th place semifinals

11th place match

9th place match

5th−8th place playoffs

5th–8th place semifinals

7th place match

5th place match

Championship playoffs

Semifinals

3rd place match

Final

Final standings

See also
2011 FIBA Europe Under-20 Championship (Division A)

References

FIBA U20 European Championship Division B
FIBA Europe Under-20 Championship Division B
2011–12 in Bosnia and Herzegovina basketball
International youth basketball competitions hosted by Bosnia and Herzegovina
Sports competitions in Sarajevo
July 2011 sports events in Europe
FIBA Europe U-20 Championship Division B
FIBA U20